Petro Mohyla (21 December 1596 – ) was the Metropolitan of Kiev, Galicia and all Ruthenia in the Ecumenical Patriarchate of Constantinople in the Eastern Orthodox Church from 1633 to 1646.

Family
Petro Mohyla was born into the House of Movilești, who were a family of Romanian boyars. Several rulers of Moldavia and Wallachia were members of this family, including Mohyla's father, Simion Movilă, thus making him a prince. He was also a descendant of Stephen the Great, through the bloodline of his great-grandfather Petru Rareș. His uncles, Simion's brothers, were Gheorghe Movilă, the Metropolitan of Moldavia, and Ieremia Movilă, who also ruled Moldavia before and after the first reign of Simion. Petro Mohyla's mother, Marghita (Margareta), was the daughter of a Moldavian logothete, Gavrilaș Hâra. Petro Mohyla's sister Regina married prince Michał Wiśniowiecki, and their son Jeremi Wiśniowiecki, was Mohyla's nephew and supporter even though he converted to Catholicism in order to marry a Roman Catholic princess and thus inherit the Polish crown.

After Mohyla's father was murdered in 1607, Mohyla and his mother sought refuge in the Ruthenian Voivodeship, part of Lesser Poland. For a time, they lived in Kamianets-Podilskyi, and in 1608 they moved to Stanisław Żółkiewski's castle, where they stayed for sixteen years.

Career

In the 1620s, Mohyla traveled to Ukraine which at that time was in a political turmoil due to internal and external factors, in part due to Poland’s annexation of Ukrainian lands. He started preparing spiritually at his aristocratic home in Rubiejovka, where he also founded a church dedicated to Saint John the New from Suceava. He then settled in Kyevo-Pechers’ka Lavra in Kyiv (Kyiv Pechersk Lavra), which was the political, cultural, spiritual, and educational center of Ukraine.  There he joined Job Boretsky, Zacharias Kopystensky, and Pamvo Berynda, and a group of scholars and orthodox clerics who promoted ideas of national liberation and cultural self-preservation. The effects of political instability affected all spheres of life in the country. The number of printed publications was significantly reduced and many schools were closed. In order to preserve their privileges before the Polish king, the nobility, in great numbers, started to convert from Orthodoxy to Greek and Roman Catholicism.
The Romanians from Moldavia, Wallachia and Transylvania belonged to the Eastern Orthodox Church, and Old Church Slavonic was used, until the 17th century, as the common liturgical language in Romanian principalities.
In 1632 Mohyla became the bishop of Kyiv and abbot of Pecherska Lavra. Because of his ties to several European royal homes, the leadership of the Orthodox clergy entrusted him to negotiate with the Polish Sejm (parliament) and the king to lift the repressive laws against the Orthodox Church and to ease the restrictions on the use of the Church Slavonic language in schools and public offices. Mohyla’s diplomatic talent paid off. King Władysław IV reinstated the status of the Eastern Orthodox Church in the Polish–Lithuanian Commonwealth. The first years as abbot Mohyla showed that he had far-reaching goals to reform not only the monastic life at the Lavra and the Church. He wanted to strengthen the Orthodox spirituality and enhance the sense of national identity as well as raise the educational level in the country and in all Russian and Romanian lands to equal that in Western Europe.

One of the first steps in implementing this vision, Mohyla founded at the Lavra a school for young monks (1632). The tutoring was conducted in Latin. The students studied theology, philosophy, rhetoric, and classical authors. At the same time, Mohyla significantly improved the print shop at the Lavra where Orthodox books were published not only in Old Slavic but in Latin as well and distributed to various places in eastern Europe. Later that year, Mohyla merged this school with the Kyiv Brotherhood school and created the Mohyla collegium which later became known as the Kyiv Mohyla Academy (National University of Kyiv-Mohyla Academy). The students at the collegium had diverse backgrounds. They came from noble, clerical, gentry, Cossack and peasant families. The school offered a variety of disciplines: Church Slavonic, Latin, Greek, and Polish languages; philosophy; mathematics, including geometry, astronomy, music and history. Because of the high profile of the faculty, the collegium received the status of a higher educational establishment.

In the next few years, Mohyla established a whole network of schools around Ukraine as well as the Slavonic-Greek-Latin Academy in Vinnytsia and collegium in Kremenets. Also, he supplied the prince of Wallachia, Matei Basarab, upon his request, with a printing press and printers. In 1635 the prayer books which were published in Prince Basarab’s monastic residence were widely distributed in Wallachia (later to become Romania) and Ukraine. He helped to establish the school in Iași in Moldova as well.

Printing

For over 20 years, Mohyla played a leading role in Ukraine’s book printing. He was one of the first to print in the Ukrainian language. Mohyla and his followers at the Lavra and the Mohyla collegium made the first steps in formulating the fundamentals of the modern Russian and Ukrainian languages. The proliferation of the Ukrainian language in print was part of a wider effort of Ukraine’s struggle for sovereignty and cultural self-preservation. Mohyla wanted to preserve the Ukrainian nation’s identity that had been experiencing enormous pressure from the Polish and Lithuanian regimes. He initiated the publication of sermons for the laity in Ukrainian, Biblical texts in Church Slavonic, and scientific books in Ukrainian, Polish, Greek, and Latin. Mohyla wrote several books which were distributed in Ukraine, Belarus, Poland, Muscovy, Romania, and Georgia.  One of his most important publications was the first Orthodox Catholic Catechesis worldwide (1640), written by him on the request of all Orthodox Catholic churches. After it was approved by several  Ecumenical Patriarchs of Constantinople it became the foundational document for the Church doctrine in the orthodox world. During the 17th and 18th centuries, this book had 25 editions. His other notable works included Trebnyk or Euchologion (1646). It resembled an encyclopedia in which all Ukrainian church rites and services were systematized. In this, he did much to preserve the purity of Orthodox ritual.

A decade earlier, he published his Anthologion in which he emphasized the need for teachers to find unique approaches to each student when teaching since their abilities varied. Applying the same requirements to all students may not be the most effective teaching method. Mohyla stressed the need for students to ponder over and understand and not simply repeat scientific, religious, and moral truths. In this and other works, Mohyla underscored the need for the younger generation to use their minds and not emotions in striving to achieve goals.

In his Triodion (1631), Mohyla expressed his political views about what an ideal ruler should look like. He argued that the person has to maintain peace with the neighbors; defend his lands in the times of war; a ruler is not only obligated to issue laws but first of all he should limit his own powers.

Project of a Polish nobleman of the Greek religion (1645) a Latin manuscript printed firstly in 1928 presents his "Project of Union" consisted of his own acceptance of the divine Primacy of the Roman Pontiff, while observing that the legitimate rights of the Eastern patriarchates must be respected by the West.

Legacy
Mohyla’s innovative approach in reforming the education system by introducing Latin in the curriculum of schools and universities met some resistance when Ruthenian loyalists resorted to violent acts against teachers and educational facilities where Latin was taught. However, Mohyla remained undeterred in his efforts to make the use of Latin in schools obligatory since it was an essential part in the curriculum in all European schools and universities. One of Mohyla’s main arguments in favor of Latin was that students who learn it in Ukraine would have an advantage  should they decide to continue their studies in other European universities, since Latin was practically the lingua franca of the scholarly world.

Historic preservation was another aspect of Mohyla's multifaceted career. He initiated substantial restoration projects of key historical monuments in Kyiv and around the country. Among them was the cathedral of Saint Sophia in Kyiv. People believed that for as long the cathedral was standing, the city would be spared from destruction. Thus by restoring St. Sophia and other monuments, Mohyla, on the one hand, strengthened the Ukrainian Church’s position, and on the other, his efforts were a morale booster for the whole country at a times when national unity and independence were at risk.

Petro Mohyla died in 1647, on the eve of the national liberation war of 1648-1654. In his testament, he instructed that all Ruthenian people be literate and all his property be given to the Mohyla collegium which for nearly two centuries remained the only higher education establishment in the Orthodox world. The school became an important scientific, educational, cultural, and spiritual center of Orthodox world, especially Ukraine, Belarus and Russia. Its graduates propagated ideas of humanism and national self-determination. After the Cossack Hetmanate became part of Russia, graduates helped Nikon to introduce the Ukrainian Orthodox faith to Russians to have the common faith in Ukraine, Belarus and Russia. Many of graduates pursued their careers in Western Europe but many traveled the countryside and taught in villages and towns. According to the Christian Arab scholar Paul of Aleppo, who in 1655 traveled through Ukraine to Moscow, “Even villagers in Ukraine can read and write …and village priests consider it their duty to instruct orphans and not let them run in the streets as vagabonds.”

Thus Petro Mohyla is credited with laying the foundation for a cultural epoch which historians call the Mohyla period. One of the attributes of this epoch was book publication. Despite the political instability in Ukraine in the late 1600s, it had 13 printing presses, of which 9 were Ukrainian, 3 Polish, and 1 Jewish. The output of these presses was not only of a religious nature. For example, in 1679 the press in Novhorod-Siverski put out over 3 000 copies of various textbooks for elementary schools. This was a tremendous achievement due in part to Mohyla’s efforts to spread literacy among all social groups.

Veneration 
Even during the lifetime of Metropolitan Peter Mohyla, as well as shortly after his death, panegyrics and speeches were created in his honor, which glorified the person and the actions of the hierarch. From the 17th century 12 diverse texts in Old Ukrainian, Old Polish and Latin are known. Among their authors are printers of the Lavra typography, professors and students of the Kyiv-Mohyla Collegium, as well as such famous writers and figures as Protosingel Pamva Berinda, Hieromonk Tarasii Zemka, Hieromonk Sophronii Pochaskyi, Monk Yosif Kalimon, Bishop Feodosiy Vasylevich-Baevskyi, Archbishop Lazar Baranovych and Hegumen Antony Radyvylovskyi. In their works, epithets and similes are used to glorify the metropolitan, which include symbolic interpretation of the figures of Mohyla's family coat of arms, analogies with the sun and other natural phenomenas, characters of ancient mythology, various associations with the name, and biblical images and plots. These works indicate a special attitude towards the metropolitan among Ukrainian church and cultural figures of the 17th century.

Sainthood

He is venerated as a saint in the Ukrainian Orthodox Church, the Russian Orthodox Church, the Romanian Orthodox Church, and the Polish Orthodox Church. His feast day is 1 January but he is also commemorated on 5 October, together with the other sainted Metropolitans of Kyiv.

The Greek Orthodox Church has tended to be more suspicious of Petro Mohyla, some believing him to be too influenced by trends in Roman Catholic theology. The Orthodox Church in America is also suspicious of Petro Mohyla, but nevertheless they list him on their website as a saint.

Honours
National University of Kyiv-Mohyla Academy in Kyiv is named after Petro Mohyla
St. Petro Mohyla Institute in Saskatoon, Canada, is named after him.
In 2003 a monument dedicated to Petro Mohyla was erected in Kyiv. The authors of the monument are Borys Krylov and Oles Sydoruk.

See also
Synod of Iași
Vasilian College

Notelist

Sources

Orest Subtelny, Ukraine: A History, University of Toronto Press, 1988
 Українська педагогіка в персоналіях – ХІХ століття / За редакцією О.В. Сухомлинської / навчальний посібник для студентів вищих навчальних закладів, у двох книгах// «Либідь», - К., 2005, кн. 1., стор. 100-110
 Довідник з історії України. За ред. І.Підкови та Р.Шуста. — К.: Генеза, 1993.
 Гайдай Л. Історія України в особах, термінах, назвах і поняттях. — Луцьк: Вежа, 2000.
[in Ukrainian] Митрофан (Божко), архім. Образи святителя Петра Могили, митрополита Київського і Галицького, у панегіриках і посвятах XVII ст. // Труди Київської Духовної Академії. — №37. — К.: Київська духовна академія і семінарія, 2022. — С.121–139.

References

General

External links
 
 Oleksander Ohloblyn, Arkadii Zhukovsky, Mohyla, Petro in the Encyclopedia of Ukraine, 2010
 

1596 births
1647 deaths
Metropolitans of Kiev, Galicia and all Rus' (1620-1686)
Eastern Orthodox theologians
University and college founders
Constantinople Exarchs of Ukraine
People of the Polish–Ottoman War (1620–21)
Romanian saints
Polish saints of the Eastern Orthodox Church
People from Suceava
Moldavian emigrants to Poland
Ruthenian nobility
17th-century Christian saints
Archimandrites
Hegumens of Kyiv Pechersk Lavra
17th-century philanthropists